The Women's individual large hill competition at the FIS Nordic World Ski Championships 2021 was held on 3 March. A qualification was held on 2 March 2021.

Results

Qualification
The qualification was started on 2 March at 18:00.

Final
The first round was started on 3 March at 17:15 and the final round at 18:07.

References

Women's individual large hill